Avalon (with the tagline The 3D Adventure Movie on the box cover) is an action-adventure game written by Steve Turner for the ZX Spectrum and published by Hewson Consultants in 1984. Avalon was followed by a sequel in 1985, Dragontorc.

Plot

Avalon is set in Britain in the year 408, during the collapse of the Western Roman Empire. The player controls Maroc, a "lore-seeker" who has been given a staff and map by a strange old woman and pointed in the direction of a place called Glass Hill on the isle of Avalon, where a quest to defeat the Lord of Chaos begins.

The name "Avalon" is taken from King Arthur's legendary resting place, the isle of Avalon, while a figure named Avallach features in Welsh mythology. Other than this and the time period the game is set in, there is little connection to the Arthurian legend.

Gameplay

Avalon involves controlling Maroc the mage in his quest to destroy Avelach, Lord of Chaos. The player's character cannot be killed. The game world is explored by an astral projection of Maroc; if Maroc's energy is depleted the projection returns to Maroc's "physical" body, from which the game can be continued.

Reception

 91% (CRASH #10, November 1984).
Home Computing Weekly
Sinclair User
Computer and Video Games
Eurogamer.net
Personal Computer Games
MicroHobby

References

External links

1984 video games
Europe-exclusive video games
Fantasy video games set in the Middle Ages
Hewson Consultants games
Single-player video games
Video games based on Arthurian legend
Video games developed in the United Kingdom
ZX Spectrum games
ZX Spectrum-only games